This is a list of all the United States Supreme Court cases from volume 540 of the United States Reports:

External links

2003 in United States case law
2004 in United States case law